
Włodawa County is a unit of territorial administration and local government (powiat) in Lublin Voivodeship, eastern Poland, on the border with Ukraine and Belarus. It was established on January 1, 1999, as a result of the Polish local government reforms passed in 1998.

As of 2019, its total population is 38,524, including a population of 13,167 in Włodawa and a rural population of 25,357.

Neighbouring counties
Włodawa County is bordered by Chełm County to the south, Łęczna County and Parczew County to the west, and Biała Podlaska County to the north. It also borders Ukraine and Belarus to the east.

Administrative division
The county is subdivided into eight gminas (one urban and seven rural). These are listed in the following table, in descending order of population.

References

 
Land counties of Lublin Voivodeship